Muhammadiyah; officially Muhammadiyah Society is a major Islamic non-governmental organization in Indonesia. The organization was founded in 1912 by Ahmad Dahlan in the city of Yogyakarta as a reformist socioreligious movement, advocating ijtihad - individual interpretation of Qur'an and Sunnah, as opposed to Taqlid - conformity to the traditional interpretations propounded by the ulama. Since its establishment, Muhammadiyah has adopted a reformist platform mixing religious and secular education, primarily as a way to promote the upward mobility of Muslims toward a 'modern' community and to purify Indonesian Islam of local syncretic practices. It continues to support local culture and promote religious tolerance in Indonesia, while a few of its higher education institutions are attended mostly by non-Muslims, especially in East Nusa Tenggara and Papua provinces. The group also runs a large chain of charity hospitals, and operated 128 universities as of the late 1990s.

In 2008, Muhammadiyah was considered the second largest Islamic organization in Indonesia with 29 million members. Although Muhammadiyah leaders and members are often actively involved in shaping the politics in Indonesia, Muhammadiyah is not a political party. It has devoted itself to social and educational activities.

History

On November 18, 1912, Ahmad Dahlan— a court official of the kraton of Yogyakarta and an educated Muslim scholar from Mecca—established Muhammadiyah in Yogyakarta. There were a number of motives behind the establishment of this movement. Among the important ones are the backwardness of Muslim society and the penetration of Christianity. Ahmad Dahlan, much influenced by Egyptian reformist Muhammad Abduh, considered modernization and purification of religion from syncretic practices were very vital in reforming this religion. Therefore, since its beginning Muhammadiyah has been very concerned with maintaining tawhid and refining monotheism in society.

From 1913 to 1918, Muhammadiyah established five Islamic Schools. In 1919 an Islamic high school, Hooge School Muhammadiyah was established. In establishing schools, Muhammadiyah received significant help from the Boedi Oetomo, an important nationalist movement in Indonesia in the first half of the twentieth century, which provided teachers. Muhammadiyah has generally avoided politics. Unlike its traditionalist counterpart, the Nahdatul Ulama, it never formed a political party. Since its establishment, it has devoted itself to educational and social activities.

In 1925, two years after the death of Dahlan, Muhammadiyah only had 4,000 members but had built 55 schools and two clinics in Surabaya and Yogyakarta.  After Abdul Karim Amrullah introduced the organisation to the Minangkabau ethnicity, a dynamic Muslim community, Muhammadiyah developed rapidly. In 1938, the organisation claimed 250,000 members, managed its 834 mosques, 31 libraries, 1,774 schools, and 7,630 ulema. The Minangkabau Merchants spread organization to the entire of Indonesia.

During the 1965-66 political turbulence and violence, Muhammadiyah declared that the extermination of the Indonesian Communist Party constituted Holy War, a view endorsed by other Islamic groups. (See also: Indonesian killings of 1965-66). During the events surrounding the 1998 fall of President Suharto, some parts of Muhammadiyah urged the leadership to form a party. Therefore, the leadership, including Muhammadiyah's chairman, Amien Rais, founded the National Mandate Party. Although gaining large support from Muhammadiyah members, this party has no official relationship with Muhammadiyah. The leader of Muhammadiyah said the members of his organisation are free to align themselves with political parties of their choosing, provided such parties have shared values with Muhammadiyah.

In 2008, with 29 million members, Muhammadiyah was the second largest Muslim organization in Indonesia, after Nahdlatul Ulama.

Doctrine
The central doctrine of Muhammadiyah is Sunni Islam. However, it emphasizes the authority of the Qur'an and the Hadiths as supreme Islamic law that serves as the legitimate basis of the interpretation of religious belief and practices. This is contrasted with traditional practices where shariah law is invested in religious schools by ulema. The main focus of the Muhammadiyah movement is to heighten people's sense of moral responsibility, purifying their faith to true Islam. Theologically, Muhammadiyyah adheres to doctrines of Salafiyya; calling for directly returning to the Qur'an and Sunnah and the understanding of the Imams of the Salaf (early generations), including the eponyms of the four Sunni Madh'habs (legal schools). It advocates for a purification of faith from various local customs which they consider to be superstitious, heretical and forms of shirk (polytheism). Muhammadiyya directly traces its scholarly heritage to the teachings of Muhammad Rashid Rida (d. 1935 C.E / 1354 A.H), Muhammad ibn 'Abd al-Wahhab (d. 1792 / 1206 A.H), and the medieval theologians Ahmad Ibn Taymiyyah (d. 1328 C.E / 728 A.H) and Ibn Qayyim (d. 1350 / 751 A.H).

Muhammadiyah strongly opposes syncretism, where Islam had coalesced with animism (spirit worship) and with Hindu-Buddhist elements that were spread among communities from the pre-Islamic period. Muhammadiyah opposes the tradition of Sufism that allows a Sufi leader (shaykh) to be the formal authority over Muslims. As of 2006, the organization was said to have "veered sharply toward a more conservative brand of Islam"  under the leadership of Din Syamsuddin the head of the Indonesian Ulema Council. However, some factions of Muhammadiyyah tend to espouse the modernist movement of Muhammad Abduh rather than the Salafi doctrines of Rashīd Rîdá; which has been described as "rigid and conservative".

Muhammadiyah takes soft approach on LGBT people. Muhammadiyah considered LGBT expression immoral. They also support conversion therapy in schools.

Activities

Muhammadiyah was noted as a Muslim reformists organization. Its main activities are religious practice and education. It has built modern Islamic schools, differing from traditional pesantren. Some of its schools are also open to non-Muslims. In 2006 there were around 5,754 schools owned by Muhammadiyah.

It also functioned as a charitable organization involved in health care. In 2016, it owned several hundred non-profit medical clinics and hospitals across Indonesia. In 2006, it was active in campaigning about the danger of bird flu in Indonesia.

Organization

The national headquarters was originally in Yogyakarta. However, by 1970 the committees dealing with education, economics, health and social welfare had been relocated to the national capital, Jakarta.

Muhammadiyah is supported by several autonomous organizations:

 Aisyiyah (women)
 Pemuda Muhammadiyah (youth)
 Nasyiatul Aisyiyah (women's youth)
 Ikatan Pelajar Muhammadiyah (students)
 Ikatan Mahasiswa Muhammadiyah (college/university students)
 Tapak Suci Putera Muhammadiyah (pencak silat martial arts)
 Hizbul Wathan (scouting).

The central committee structure consists of five advisors, a chairman with several deputies, a vice chairman, a secretary general with some deputies, and a treasurer with some deputies.

List of leaders

Universities
The Muhammadiyah organisation has a number of universities which are spread out in several provinces of Indonesia, such as:
 Ahmad Dahlan University of Yogyakarta (UAD)
 Muhammadiyah University of Malang (UMM)
 Muhammadiyah University of Yogyakarta (UMY)
 Muhammadiyah University of Surakarta (UMS)
 Muhammadiyah University of Purwokerto
 Muhammadiyah University of Makassar (Unismuh)
 Muhammadiyah University of Magelang (UMMGL)
 Muhammadiyah University of Semarang
 Muhammadiyah University of Metro
 Muhammadiyah University of Palembang
 Muhammadiyah University of Bengkulu
 Muhammadiyah University of West Sumatra
 Muhammadiyah University of North Sumatra
 Muhammadiyah University of Aceh
 Muhammadiyah University of Cirebon
 Muhammadiyah University of Bekasi
 Muhammadiyah University of Purworejo
 Muhammadiyah University of Surabaya
 Muhammadiyah University of Sidoarjo
 Muhammadiyah University of Gresik
 Muhammadiyah University of Jember
 Muhammadiyah University of Kupang
 Muhammadiyah University of Ternate
 Muhammadiyah University of Gorontalo
 Muhammadiyah University of Jakarta
 Muhammadiyah University of Prof. Hamka (UHAMKA)
 Muhammadiyah University of Parepare
 Muhammadiyah University of Sukabumi
 Muhammadiyah University of Ponorogo
 Muhammadiyah University of Pontianak
 Muhammadiyah University of Kalimantan Timur (UMKT)
 Muhammadiyah University of Sorong
 Muhammadiyah University of Mataram
 Muhammadiyah University of Bima

See also

 Nahdatul Ulama
 Islam in Indonesia
 Pencak silat

References

External links
 Official website
 Official magazine
 Pacific Affairs, Vol. 27, No. 3 (Sep., 1954), pp. 255-263 Modern Islam in Indonesia: The Muhammadiyah After Independence
 Ali Shodiqin, Mochammad. 2014. "Muhammadiyah itu NU!: Dokumen Fiqh yang Terlupakan". Jakarta: NouraBooks. 
 Burhani, Ahmad Najib. 2005. "Revealing the Neglected Missions: Some Comments on the Javanese Elements of Muhammadiyah Reformism." Studia Islamika, 12 (1): 101–129.
 Burhani, Ahmad Najib. 2010. Muhammadiyah Jawa. Jakarta: Al-Wasat.
 
 
 Ricklefs, M.C. 1991. A History of Modern Indonesia since c.1300. 2nd Edition, Stanford: Stanford University Press. 

 
Islamic organizations established in 1912
Indonesian National Awakening
Salafi groups
Islamic organizations based in Indonesia
1912 establishments in the Dutch East Indies